Acrolophus piger, the piger grass tubeworm moth, is a moth of the family Acrolophidae. It was described by Harrison Gray Dyar Jr. in 1900. It is found in North America, including Alabama, Florida, Mississippi, North Carolina, South Carolina and Texas.

The wingspan is about 16 mm.

References

Moths described in 1900
piger